The 2015–16 USC Trojans women's basketball team will represent University of Southern California during the 2015–16 NCAA Division I women's basketball season. The Trojans, led by third year head coach Cynthia Cooper-Dyke, play their home games at the Galen Center and were members of the Pac-12 Conference. They finished the season 19–13, 6–12 in Pac-12 play to finish in eighth place. They advanced to the quarterfinals of the Pac-12 women's basketball tournament where they lost to Oregon State.

Roster

Schedule

|-
!colspan=9 style="background:#990000; color:#FFCC00;"| Exhibition

|-
!colspan=9 style="background:#990000; color:#FFCC00;"| Non-conference regular season

|-
!colspan=9 style="background:#990000; color:#FFCC00;"| Pac-12 regular season

|-
!colspan=9 style="background:#990000;"| Pac-12 Conference Women's Tournament

Rankings

See also
2015–16 USC Trojans men's basketball team

References

USC Trojans women's basketball seasons
USC
USC Trojans
USC Trojans